Elenore Plaisted Abbott (1875–1935) was an American book illustrator, scenic designer, and painter. She illustrated early 20th-century editions of Grimm's Fairy Tales, Robinson Crusoe, and Kidnapped. Several books were published as illustrated by Elenore Plaisted Abbott and Helen Alden Knipe (later Carpenter).

Abbott was educated at three art schools in Philadelphia and Paris and influenced by Howard Pyle. She was among a group of New Women who sought educational and professional opportunities for women, including creating professional art associations like The Plastic Club to promote their work. She was married to fellow artist and lawyer C. Yarnall Abbott.

Early life and education
Elenore Plaisted was born in Lincoln, Maine. She studied art at the Philadelphia School of Design for Women, Pennsylvania Academy of Fine Arts, and in Paris, France at the Académie des Beaux-Arts, where her work was exhibited. Abbott moved back to Philadelphia in 1899. She was influenced significantly by  Howard Pyle, her instructor at the Drexel Institute. She said later in her life that she created her favorite pieces under his tutelage.

Career
Abbott, known for her book illustrations, was also a landscape and portrait painter and scenic designer, including work for Hedgerow Theatre's production of The Emperor Jones. She produced illustrations for Harper's Magazine, the Saturday Evening Post, and Scribner's magazines. Abbott created illustrations for books, such as Robert Louis Stevenson's Treasure Island and Kidnapped, Johann David Wyss's Swiss Family Robinson, Louisa May Alcott's Old Fashioned Girl, and the Grimm's Fairy Tales.

Abbott was a member of the Philadelphia Water Color Club and Philadelphia's The Plastic Club, an organization established by women artists to promote "Art for art's sake". Its members included Jessie Wilcox Smith, Violet Oakley, and Elizabeth Shippen Green. These women were identified as the New Woman. As educational opportunities were made more available in the 19th century, women artists became part of professional enterprises, including founding their own art associations. Artwork made by women was considered to be inferior, and to help overcome that stereotype women became "increasingly vocal and confident" in promoting women's work, and thus became part of the emerging image of the educated, modern and freer "New Woman". Artists "played crucial roles in representing the New Woman, both by drawing images of the icon and exemplifying this emerging type through their own lives." In the late 19th-century and early 20th century about 88% of the subscribers of 11,000 magazines and periodicals were women. As women entered the artist community, publishers hired women to create illustrations that depict the world through a woman's perspective. Other successful illustrators were Jennie Augusta Brownscombe and Rose O'Neill.

Personal life
Elenore married lawyer and artist C. Yarnall Abbott in 1898 and the couple lived in Rose Valley, Pennsylvania after 1911. Her husband designed the family house with a studio for Elenore and himself. Their daughter Marjorie, named after Elenore's maternal aunt, was born in 1907. When her aunt died, the Abbotts took in her daughters, Sonya and Elenore. Elenore Abbot co-founded the Rose Valley swimming pool, in 1928, which was housed on land donated by the Abbotts and financed by the sale of some of Elenore's paintings.

Works

Illustrations

Watercolor paintings 
She made the following watercolor paintings by 1916, when they were exhibited at the Philadelphia Water Color Exhibition:
 Endymion and the Nereids
 The Fairy Tale
 Kerfol
 Lamia
 Madrigal
 The Mother
 Oh, to Line in the Grass with Pan!
 Water

Collections
 Brandywine River Museum, Chadds Ford, Pennsylvania
 I Was Despairing When the Bird Returned, watercolor on illustration board for Swiss Family Robinson
 On a Rude Throne Sat the Mother, watercolor on illustration board for Swiss Family Robinson
 The Cluster of Grapes Were Ripe and Rich, watercolor on illustration board for Robinson Crusoe
 The Monkey Resumed His Place, watercolor on illustration board for Swiss Family Robinson
 Louise Porter (portrait), oil on canvas
 Presently I Found I Was Holding to a Spar, watercolor on illustration board for Kidnapped
 We Retired to Our Airy Castle, watercolor on illustration board for Swiss Family Robinson
 Delaware Art Museum, Wilmington, DE
 I Was Awakened by the Light of a Hand Lantern Shining in My Face, 1915, gouache on paper for Kidnapped
 Now and Again I Stumbled, 1911, gouache on paper for Treasure Island
 One Glance Was Sufficient, 1911, watercolor on paper for Treasure Island
 Take Me in Straight Or I'll Break Your Arm, 1911, watercolor on paper for Treasure Island
 When I Waked, It Was Broad Day, 1913, gouache on paper for Robinson Crusue
 Pennsylvania Academy of the Fine Arts, Philadelphia
 The Dance, 1896–1897, mural

Gallery

Notes

References

Further reading
 Wolf, Eva Nagel. "Eleanor Abbott, Illustrator." The International Studio. London: John Lane Company (1919). pp XXVII

External links
 
 

1875 births
1935 deaths
American women illustrators
American children's book illustrators
20th-century American painters
20th-century illustrators of fairy tales
People from Lincoln, Maine
American women painters
Artists from Maine
Art Nouveau designers
Art Nouveau illustrators
Art Nouveau painters
20th-century American women artists
American expatriates in France
Philadelphia School of Design for Women alumni